A winter weather advisory (originally identified as a Traveler's Advisory until the 2002-03 climatological winter when officially renamed, and informally as such by some local television stations thereafter) is a hazardous weather statement issued by Weather Forecast Offices (WFO) of the National Weather Service in the United States when one or more types of winter precipitation—snow, rain and snow mixed, freezing rain, sleet, graupel, etc.—presenting a hazard, but not expected to produce accumulations meeting storm warning criteria (usually below 10 cm / 4 inches), are forecast within 36 hours of the expected onset of precipitation or are occurring in the advisory's coverage area.

A Winter Weather Advisory is similar to a significant weather advisory, but a winter weather advisory is an official product and is specific to cold weather. A similar warning is issued by Environment and Climate Change Canada's Meteorological Service of Canada offices. The advisory criteria vary from area to area and weather service to weather service. For example, any measurable snow will constitute the advisory in Florida, while forecast accumulations of  will merit issuance in New England. If other forms of wintry precipitation are expected, then a Winter Weather Advisory or Winter Storm Warning can be issued, also depending on the amount and accumulation of precipitation that is expected.

Prior to the 2008-09 winter storm season, there was the snow advisory, specific for when snow was the only hazard expected in the advised area, the sleet advisory, specific for when sleet was the only hazard expected in the advised area, the blowing snow advisory, specific for when blowing snow was the only hazard expected in the advised area, and the Snow and Blowing Snow Advisory, specific for when stable snow and blowing snow were the only hazards expected in the advised area. The Winter Weather Advisories for Snow, for Sleet, for Blowing Snow, and for Snow and Blowing Snow, respectively, have since replaced them.

Types
Because of the changes with the 2008-09 winter storm season, several varieties have been noted throughout the US.

Winter Weather Advisory for Snow (Replaced the Snow Advisory)
Winter Weather Advisory for Snow and Blowing Snow (Replaced the Snow and Blowing Snow Advisory)
Winter Weather Advisory for Blowing Snow (Replaced the Blowing Snow Advisory)
Winter Weather Advisory for Sleet (Replaced the Sleet Advisory)
Winter Weather Advisory for Snow, Sleet, and Freezing Rain, or a different combination thereof (Replaced the generic Winter Weather Advisory)
Winter Weather Advisory for Freezing Rain (Replaced the Freezing Rain Advisory) (2017)
Winter Weather Advisory for Lake-effect Snow (Replaced the Lake Effect Snow Advisory) (2017)
Also to be noted:
Winter Storm Watch is given when a winter storm is likely to occur.
Winter Storm Warning is given when a winter storm is moving into the area and that the public should take protective action.
Also, the generic term, Winter Weather Advisory, may be used on its own, typically to indicate that all three winter precipitation types are expected in moderate amounts. However, the generic term may be used at the forecaster's discretion regardless of whether or not the condition applies

Example of a Snow Advisory
URGENT - WINTER WEATHER MESSAGE
NATIONAL WEATHER SERVICE GREAT FALLS MT
657 PM MST SUN DEC 9 2007

MTZ008>015-044-045-047-048-050>055-101100-
/O.CON.KTFX.SN.Y.0025.071210T1100Z-071211T0000Z/
BEAVERHEAD-NORTHERN ROCKY MOUNTAIN FRONT-EASTERN GLACIER-HILL-
CASCADE-CHOUTEAU-CENTRAL AND SOUTHERN LEWIS AND CLARK-MADISON-
TOOLE-LIBERTY-BLAINE-SOUTHERN ROCKY MOUNTAIN FRONT-JUDITH BASIN-
FERGUS-JEFFERSON-BROADWATER-MEAGHER-GALLATIN-
INCLUDING THE CITIES OF...DILLON...BROWNING...CUT BANK...HAVRE...
GREAT FALLS...FORT BENTON...HELENA...LINCOLN...ENNIS...SHELBY...
CHESTER...CHINOOK...CHOTEAU...STANFORD...LEWISTOWN...BOULDER...
TOWNSEND...WHITE SULPHUR SPRINGS...BOZEMAN...WEST YELLOWSTONE
657 PM MST SUN DEC 9 2007

...SNOW ADVISORY REMAINS IN EFFECT FROM 4 AM TO 5 PM MST MONDAY
FOR ELEVATIONS ABOVE 4500 FEET...

A SNOW ADVISORY REMAINS IN EFFECT FROM 4 AM TO 5 PM MST MONDAY
FOR ELEVATIONS ABOVE 4500 FEET.

PERIODS OF LIGHT SNOW ARE EXPECTED TO FALL OVER THE ROCKY
MOUNTAIN FRONT...THE CENTRAL MOUNTAINS...AND ACROSS MUCH OF
SOUTHWEST MONTANA FROM MONDAY MORNING THROUGH MONDAY AFTERNOON.
EXPECT NEW SNOW ACCUMULATIONS ON MONDAY TO RANGE FROM 2 TO
6 INCHES FOR ELEVATIONS ABOVE 4500 FEET...WHILE SNOW
ACCUMULATIONS WILL GENERALLY BE LESS THAN 1 INCH AT LOWER
ELEVATIONS. AREAS OF BLOWING AND DRIFTING SNOW WILL REDUCE
VISIBILITIES AT TIMES.

A SNOW ADVISORY MEANS THAT PERIODS OF SNOW WILL CAUSE PRIMARILY
TRAVEL DIFFICULTIES. BE PREPARED FOR SNOW COVERED ROADS AND
LIMITED VISIBILITIES...AND USE CAUTION WHILE DRIVING.

LISTEN TO NOAA WEATHER RADIO...OR YOUR LOCAL MEDIA FOR THE LATEST
UPDATES ON THIS SITUATION.

$$

Example of a Winter Weather Advisory
The Following is an Example of a Winter Weather Advisory For Snow, Issued by Des Moines.

IAZ004>006-016-017-026>028-270430-
/O.UPG.KDMX.WS.A.0006.190427T1200Z-190428T0000Z/
/O.NEW.KDMX.WW.Y.0028.190427T1200Z-190428T0000Z/
Emmet-Kossuth-Winnebago-Hancock-Cerro Gordo-Franklin-Butler-
Bremer-
Including the cities of Estherville, Algona, Forest City,
Lake Mills, Garner, Britt, Kanawha, Mason City, Clear Lake,
Hampton, Parkersburg, Clarksville, Shell Rock, Greene, Aplington,
Allison, Dumont, and Waverly
324 PM CDT Fri Apr 26 2019

...WINTER WEATHER ADVISORY IN EFFECT FROM 7 AM TO 7 PM CDT
SATURDAY...

* WHAT...Snow expected. Total snow accumulations of 1 to 5 inches
  expected. Winds gusting as high as 30 mph.

* WHERE...Northern Iowa.
* WHEN...From 7 AM to 7 PM CDT Saturday.
* ADDITIONAL DETAILS...Plan on slippery road conditions.

PRECAUTIONARY/PREPAREDNESS ACTIONS...

A Winter Weather Advisory for snow means periods of snow will
cause primarily travel difficulties. Expect snow covered roads
and limited visibilities, and use caution while driving.

The latest road conditions for the state you are calling from can
be obtained by calling 5 1 1.

&&

$$

See also
 Severe weather terminology (United States)
 Winter storm warning
 Winter storm watch

References

External links
 National Weather Service
 Federal Emergency Management Agency

Weather warnings and advisories
Winter